Apple Tree Yard is a British television psychological thriller, adapted from the 2013 novel of the same name by Louise Doughty. The four-part series was commissioned in 2016 and the first episode had its premiere on BBC One on 22 January 2017. Emily Watson stars as the novel's original lead, Yvonne Carmichael, with Ben Chaplin portraying the role of her lover, Mark Costley. Apple Tree Yard follows the story of Carmichael, a conflicted, moderately unhappily-married fifty-something scientist, who begins a covert yet flagrant affair with Costley whilst completely unaware of his background.

Cast
 Emily Watson as Yvonne Carmichael
 Ben Chaplin as Mark Costley
 Mark Bonnar as Gary Carmichael
 Steven Elder as George Selway
 Kezia Burrows as Kate Costley
 Susan Lynch as Susannah
 Franc Ashman as Liz
 Laure Stockley as Rosa
 Olivia Vinall as Carrie
 Assad Zaman as Sathnam
 Robin Morrissey as Jamie
 Jack Hamilton as Adam
 Grace Carey as Maddie
 Beth Chalmers as Sally
 Jim Creighton as Jake
 Alexis Conran as Harry
 Susannah Doyle as Marcia
 Darren Morfitt as Kevin
 Rhashan Stone as Robert
 Frances Tomelty as Price
 Denise Gough as DS Johns

Plot
After giving a presentation in the House of Commons, Yvonne Carmichael (Watson) meets a lean and mysterious man (Ben Chaplin), who charms her by offering her a tour of the locked Secret Chapel of the Commons. They quickly take likings to one another and have sex in the historic former broom cupboard. Afterwards, Yvonne begins secretly to compose fantasy letters playing out a relationship with the stranger, Mr X. The next day, Yvonne tracks Mr X to a café opposite the Commons, inviting him for coffee. After engaging in unbridled, consensual coitus in the café toilets, they agree to an illicit affair fueled by the thrill of engaging in sexual acts, at times in public places. Yvonne becomes aware that her lover is unwilling to reveal his true identity, but begins to thrive on their shared secret. One night, after meeting with Mr. X in Apple Tree Yard, Yvonne attends a party for one of her colleagues. There, she is approached by a colleague, George (Elder), who reveals that he has harboured secret feelings for her for some time. When she rejects his advances, George brutally rapes her.

Traumatised from the attack, Yvonne is forced to take time away from work. She slowly begins to confide in Mr X, who advises her to speak to a rape expert before she decides whether to report the incident to the police. She decides against doing so, but also breaks off the affair. Yvonne tries to pluck up the courage to face her colleagues, but realises that she cannot get the image of George out of her head. She later makes the decision to resign from her job and focus more on her personal life. When she discovers that her husband Gary has spent the weekend away in bed with his intern, Yvonne completely abandons the idea of retirement and decides to reignite her affair with Mr X. However, she begins to notice that George is stalking her. Yvonne is confronted by George in a local shop, causing her to accept Mr X's offer to "resolve" the problem, expecting him to intimidate George by beating him up. They drive to George's house where, with Yvonne staying in the car, Mr X goes inside. When he returns, looking anxious, she drives him away and they eventually part company.

Shortly afterwards, Yvonne and Mr X, named by officials as Mark Costley, are arrested and charged with George's murder. During the ensuing trial process, Yvonne believes Mark will protect her by not revealing their affair. But when expert evidence in his favour is undermined by the prosecutor, Mark allows his barrister to disclose their affair whilst cross-examining Yvonne, and she is shown to be lying under oath. However, Yvonne's powerful testimony about her rape gains the jury's sympathy, and she is found not guilty of the killing—though she receives a suspended sentence for perjury. Mark is found guilty of manslaughter on the grounds of diminished responsibility. Yvonne subsequently visits him in prison, where she recalls a moment when she asked Mark to kill George, and to smash his face in. She says to Mark that she realises he has a personality disorder that means he took her request more literally than she intended.

Production
Regarding the rape scene involving Emily Watson and Steven Elder in the first episode, director Jessica Hobbs commented that the scene was "well researched" and reflected on testimony made by several real victims in order to make the scene as accurate as possible. Watson commented; "It was an incredibly hard day for everyone. We wanted to be very sudden and very real. The people we spoke to described it as an out of body experience and so we tried to reflect that." She also noted that having worked closely with Chaplin in the past, it made filming their consensual sex scenes easier: "We've known each other a long time, and we didn't want to fumble about, waiting for someone to shout 'Cut!', which usually happens. We plotted and planned every detail. We wanted it to be realistic – what would it be like in that situation, in a cupboard with a complete stranger? Which was great. I'd never laughed so much and it felt... empowering!"

However, the rape scene was heavily criticised by several victim support organisations, with Rape Crisis England and Wales spokeswoman Katie Russell branding the scene "harrowing".

Episodes

Home media release 
The four-part series was released on DVD and Blu-ray on 20 February 2017.

Accolades

References

External links
 
 

2017 British television series debuts
2017 British television series endings
2010s British drama television series
Adultery in television
BBC television dramas
BBC television miniseries
Television series by Endemol
Television series by Fremantle (company)
2010s British television miniseries
English-language television shows
Rape in television
Television shows set in London
Television shows based on British novels